Formula One 05 is a racing video game developed by Studio Liverpool and published by Sony Computer Entertainment exclusively for PlayStation 2. It is a sequel to the 2004 video game Formula One 04 and was based on the 2005 Formula One World Championship.

Gameplay
It featured the 'Career Mode' concept from Formula One 04, which allows players to work their way through the Formula One teams over the course of five years (albeit a repeat version of the 2005 Formula One World Championship each time). This game also supports EyeToy: Cameo, allowing players to place their own face on a driver when creating their profile, but unlike F1 04, though they cannot choose their own helmet at the start, the player assumes a white unmarked helmet and only later unlocks other colours and designs.

Players start out testing for smaller teams such as Minardi, Jordan and Red Bull Racing. Like in F1 04, a generic car does exist, but it is only used in Time Attack mode. Players then work their way up the grid throughout their 'career' through a mixture of good tests and impressive race performances. As before, consistently poor performances will lead to dismissal from the player's current team. There are also occasional 'shoot-out' tests against the team's second driver (or third driver, depending on the player's current status within the team), in which both drivers complete a set of five laps each and whoever has the fastest overall time (one time based on the fastest first, second and third sectors added together) then takes the race seat. Players can now also view trophies they have received from winning races and championships after each is won in Career Mode for the first time.

As with F1 04, "classic" cars (like the Williams FW11) are unlocked once certain terms are fulfilled, such as winning a World Championship. Helmets for Career Mode are also unlocked, and there is also a hidden track (the Detroit street circuit which was used for Detroit Grand Prix) and the Paul Ricard circuit in France available for Time Attack Mode. Notably, since this game was developed before the change in the qualifying regulations midway through the actual 2005 Formula One World Championship, this game runs the original "aggregated times" format from the early part of the actual 2005 Formula One World Championship in every race in Race Weekend, Championship and Career Mode. This game also has Net Play available. A notable credit is the opening video features the song "Butterflies & Hurricanes" from English alternative rock band Muse.

The game features all the drivers and tracks from the 2005 Formula One World Championship, but does not represent the replacement drivers that featured in the real 2005 Formula One World Championship, therefore Vitantonio Liuzzi, Alexander Wurz, Ricardo Zonta, Anthony Davidson, Pedro de la Rosa, Robert Doornbos and Antônio Pizzonia are not featured.

Reception

The game received "generally favorable" reviews according to the review aggregation website Metacritic. In Japan, Famitsu gave it a score of all four sevens for a total of 28 out of 40.

The game was launched in the UK one week prior to the 2005 British Grand Prix. In order to promote the game, fans attending the race weekend were able to try and set the fastest possible lap time of Silverstone on a simulator. The fan who set the fastest overall lap would get to race against retired F1 driver Johnny Herbert on stage at the British Grand Prix after-party. Broadcaster Murray Walker provided live commentary of the head-to-head to approximately 30,000 spectators. The competition was won by 16 year old Lloyd Eveleigh who beat Herbert on stage in the head-to-head race.

For the first time in a number of years, the fans agreed that this was a massive improvement in the series and the shot in the arm it had so desperately needed. A lot of people had criticised Studio Liverpool for the lack of ambition and progress since the series appeared on the PS2 platform up to that point. With the release of Formula One 05, people saw that great strides had been made by Studio Liverpool in terms of gameplay handling and AI. 

However, there were criticisms in terms of the AI being too easy on the most difficult of settings, and about the penalty system that had been introduced on Formula One 05 which automatically reduced the revs during a penalty instead of the traditional "drive-through" penalties that previous games had seen. Overall though, the fans agreed that apart from these minor issues, Studio Liverpool had redeveloped the brand as a stepping stone for improvement for the inevitable release of the 2006 edition.

Mistakes and errors
On the select team mode, the Minardi drivers were pictured the wrong line-up: Christijan Albers was placed in the #20 car and Patrick Friesacher was placed in the #21 car.

References

External links
 

2005 video games
EyeToy games
Formula One video games
Multiplayer and single-player video games
PlayStation 2 games
PlayStation 2-only games
Psygnosis games
Sony Interactive Entertainment games
Video game sequels
Video games developed in the United Kingdom
Video games set in Australia
Video games set in Malaysia
Video games set in Bahrain
Video games set in Brazil
Video games set in China
Video games set in Spain
Video games set in Monaco
Video games set in Canada
Video games set in France
Video games set in the United Kingdom
Video games set in Germany
Video games set in Hungary
Video games set in Turkey
Video games set in Belgium
Video games set in Italy
Video games set in Indiana
Video games set in Japan